Animated Portable Network Graphics (APNG) is a file format which extends the Portable Network Graphics (PNG) specification to permit animated images that work similarly to animated GIF files, while supporting 24-bit images and 8-bit transparency not available for GIFs. It also retains backward compatibility with non-animated PNG files.

The first frame of an APNG file is stored as a normal PNG stream, so most standard PNG decoders are able to display the first frame of an APNG file. The frame speed data and extra animation frames are stored in extra chunks (as provided for by the original PNG specification). APNG competed with Multiple-image Network Graphics (MNG), a comprehensive format for bitmapped animations which was created by the same team as PNG and is obsolete. APNG's advantage was the smaller library size and compatibility with older PNG implementations.

In a comparison made between GIF, APNG and lossless WebP, APNG had the lowest file size.

History 

The APNG specification was created in 2004 by Stuart Parmenter and Vladimir Vukićević of the Mozilla Corporation to allow for storing the animations needed for interfaces such as throbbers. In May 2003, Mozilla had scrapped support for MNG animations, which provides a superset of APNG functionality, citing concerns about the large file size required for the expansive MNG decoder library (300 KB); the APNG decoder, built on the back of the PNG decoder, was a much smaller component.

Among users and maintainers of the PNG and MNG formats, APNG had a lukewarm reception. In particular, PNG was conceived to be a single-image format. APNG hides the subsequent frames in PNG ancillary chunks in such a way that APNG-unaware applications would ignore them, but there are otherwise no changes to the format to allow software to distinguish between animated and non-animated images. Some of the main concerns arising from this were the inability of applications to negotiate for PNG and APNG, or distinguish between PNG and APNG once received, or for legacy software to even inform users that there are additional frames. Glenn Randers-Pehrson spearheaded efforts to reconcile the PNG purists' position with that of APNG proponents by recommending changes to APNG's format and proposing the use of a unique MIME type (e.g., video/png), but the APNG proponents only added the different MIME type (image/apng) while insisting on the use of the .png extension instead of .apng, leading to the format not being approved by the PNG Development Group.

The PNG group officially rejected APNG as an official extension on April 20, 2007. There have been several subsequent proposals for a simple animated graphics format based on PNG using several different approaches.

Mozilla Firefox added support for APNG in version 3 trunk builds on March 23, 2007. However, because libpng is the PNG Group's reference implementation of the official specification, APNG support can never be supported in the main libpng distribution so long as it remains unratified by the Group. Iceweasel 3 supports APNG by using Mozilla's unofficial variant of libpng.

In 2008 WorldDMB adopted APNG as a backward compatible extension to enable animation as part of the MOT SlideShow user application for Digital Radio. "APNG 1.0 Specification - Animated Portable Network Graphics" is included as normative Annex A in the ETSI standard TS 101 499 V2.2.1. In 2010 Commercial Radio Broadcasters in Sydney began to include APNG animations in DAB+ digital radio broadcasts. These APNG animations are carried by the "MOT slideshow" application which accompanies the audio services. It is expected that other cities in Australia will follow in early 2011.

Mozilla's role in extending the PNG format to APNG echoes Netscape's much earlier role in popularizing animated GIFs.

In 2016, Apple adopted the APNG format as the preferred format for animated stickers in iOS 10 iMessage apps.

On March 15, 2017, APNG support was added to Chromium.

File format 

The APNG specification follows the PNG File format introducing three new ancillary chunks:

 The animation control chunk (acTL) precedes the IDAT(s) of the default image and is a kind of "marker" that this is an animated PNG file. It also contains the number of frames and the number of times to loop the animation (0 meaning infinite).
 The frame control chunk (fcTL) precedes each frame and contains its metadata : dimensions ; position (relative to the default image); duration; if once over it is cleared to black, replaced by the previous frame or drawn over by the next frame ; and if its transparency applies.
 The frame data chunk (fdAT) storing frame's content. It starts with a sequence number, then has the same structure as the default image's IDAT chunk(s).

Sequence numbers apply to both frame control and frame data chunks, which together follow a common sequence, thus enabling the order and timing of frames to be recovered should an APNG-unaware PNG editor re-order them as allowed by PNG chunk ordering rules.

Frames utilize the same bit depth, color type, compression method, filter method, interlace method, and palette (if any) as the default image.

The PNG specification was designed with future extensions in mind. An application reading a PNG file is supposed to simply ignore any chunks which it does not understand. This is the reason why APNG is backwards compatible. Existing applications just recognize the first frame and ignore the additional animation chunks.

Compression and Optimization 
A number of optimization techniques make APNG files as small as possible: Inter-frame optimization  utilizing alpha-blend and alpha dispose operations, smaller than the full-size subframes, dirty transparency, color type and color palette optimizations, and various compression options: zlib, 7-Zip, Zopfli.

Derived formats
Animated stickers for Signal are APNG with some restrictions.

Support 

A server-side library exists that allows web browsers that support the canvas tag, but do not support APNG, to display APNGs. Examples of such browsers include Microsoft Edge and Internet Explorer 9.

See also 

 Multiple-image Network Graphics
 WebM
 WebP

References

External links 

 The APNG specification at mozilla.org's Wiki
 APNG patch for libpng
 Mozilla's APNG Demo Site
 Directory of APNG Software and Developers resources
 APNG tests for browsers supporting APNG 1.0
 AJAX loading animations in APNG
 APNG consideration in the Chromium development group

Animated graphics file formats
Graphics file formats
Computer-related introductions in 2004
Mozilla
Open file formats
Portable Network Graphics